Saltburn, Marske and New Marske is a civil parish in Redcar and Cleveland in north-east England.  According to the 2001 census it had a population of 18,325 increasing to 19,134 at the 2011 census.  As its name suggests, the parish includes Saltburn, Marske-by-the-Sea and New Marske. It borders the parishes of Skelton and Brotton, Guisborough and the unparished area of Redcar.

In parliamentary terms, the parish is split between the constituencies of Middlesbrough South and East Cleveland, and Redcar.

Governance
The area, 1889–1974, was in the North Riding of Yorkshire administrative county. From 1894 until 1932, Saltburn had an urban district while Marske was in the Guisborough Rural District. In 1932 the Saltburn and Marske-by-the-Sea Urban District was formed with both parishes retained separately. 

The parishes merged in 1974 and acquired its present name in 1983. The district was replaced with the larger Cleveland county's Borough of Langbaurgh, the Borough was renamed to Langbaurgh-on-Tees in 1988 and to Redcar and Cleveland in 1996.

References

External links

Saltburn, Marske, and New Marske Parish Council

Redcar and Cleveland
Civil parishes in North Yorkshire